Martín Eguiguren (born 15 January 1941) is an Argentine weightlifter. He competed in the men's light heavyweight event at the 1964 Summer Olympics.

References

External links
 

1941 births
Living people
Argentine male weightlifters
Olympic weightlifters of Argentina
Weightlifters at the 1964 Summer Olympics
Place of birth missing (living people)
20th-century Argentine people